Harpalus euchlorus is a species of ground beetle in the subfamily Harpalinae. It was described by Édouard Ménétries in 1839.

References

euchlorus
Beetles described in 1839